Sombat Yialiher (born 16 September 1956 in Sainyabuli Province) is a Laotian politician and member of the Lao People's Revolutionary Party (LPRP).

He was elected to full membership at the 7th National Congress and retained a seat on the body until the 9th National Congress.

References

Specific

Bibliography
Books:
 

1956 births
Living people

Members of the 7th Central Committee of the Lao People's Revolutionary Party
Members of the 8th Central Committee of the Lao People's Revolutionary Party
Members of the 8th Executive Committee of the Lao People's Revolutionary Party
Government ministers of Laos
Governors of Sainyabuli
Deputy governors of Sainyabuli
Lao People's Revolutionary Party politicians
Place of birth missing (living people)
People from Sainyabuli province